Elachista antonia is a moth of the family Elachistidae. It is found on Crete.

The length of the forewings is 2.8–3.8 mm. The forewing costa is narrowly dark grey basally, the ground colour consisting of ochreous, slightly darker tipped scales. There are shorter grey fringe scales distally, forming an indistinct fringe line. The hindwings are pale grey.

References

antonia
Moths described in 2007
Moths of Europe